Vladimir Margaryan (born 8 March 1991) is an Armenian boxer. He competed in the men's welterweight event at the 2016 Summer Olympics.

References

1991 births
Living people
Armenian male boxers
Olympic boxers of Armenia
Boxers at the 2016 Summer Olympics
Place of birth missing (living people)
Welterweight boxers